Ailuk Atoll (Marshallese:) is a coral atoll of 57 islets in the Pacific Ocean, and forms a legislative district of the Ratak Chain of the Marshall Islands. The major islets are: Ajelep, Aliej, Ailuk, Alkilwe, Barorkan, Biken, Enejabrok, Enejelar, Kapen and Marib. Most of the islets are on the eastern side of the atoll. The western and southern sides of the atoll have a nearly continuous submerged coral reef, with  three main passes that lead into the lagoon: Erappu Channel, Marok Channel and Eneneman Channel on the west side.

Ailuk Atoll had a population of 339 in 2011.

History

First recorded sighting of Ailuk Atoll by Europeans was by the Spanish expedition of Miguel López de Legazpi on 10 January 1565. It was charted as Los Placeres (The Pleasures in Spanish). Two of its islets were charted as San Pedro and San Pablo, those being the names of the flagship ("capitana") and the "almiranta" (secondary ship or ship of the Admiral)

Ailuk Atoll was claimed by the Empire of Germany along with the rest of the Marshall Islands in 1884, and the Germans established a trading outpost. After World War I, the island came under the South Seas Mandate of the Empire of Japan. Following the end of World War II, it came under the control of the United States as part of the Trust Territory of the Pacific Islands until the independence of the Marshall Islands in 1986.

In December 2020, Marshall Islands police found a 5.5-meter (18-foot) fibreglass boat at Ailuk Atoll with 649 kilograms (1,430 pounds) of cocaine worth an estimated US$80 million. This was the largest drug bust in Marshall Islands history.

Education
Marshall Islands Public School System operates public schools:
 Ailuk Elementary School
 Enejelar Elementary School

Northern Islands High School on Wotje serves the community.

References

Marshall Islands site

Atolls of the Marshall Islands
Ratak Chain
Municipalities of the Marshall Islands